Toxicity characteristic leaching procedure (TCLP) is a soil sample extraction method for chemical analysis employed as an analytical method to simulate leaching through a landfill.  The testing methodology is used to determine if a waste is characteristically hazardous, i.e., classified as one of the "D" listed wastes by the U.S. Environmental Protection Agency (EPA). The extract is analyzed for substances appropriate to the protocol.

Background
In the United States, the Resource Conservation and Recovery Act (RCRA) of 1976 led to establishment of federal standards for the disposal of solid waste and hazardous waste. RCRA requires that industrial wastes and other wastes must be characterized following testing protocols published by EPA. TCLP is one of these tests.

Application of test
The Environmental Compliance Supervisor at a typical municipal landfill (as defined by RCRA Subtitle D) uses TCLP data to determine whether a waste may be accepted into the facility. If TCLP analytical results are below the TCLP D-list maximum contamination levels (MCLs) the waste can be accepted. If they are above these levels the waste must be taken to a hazardous waste disposal facility and the cost of disposal may increase from about $50.00/ton to as much as $1200.00/ton.

As extremely contaminated material is expensive to dispose of, grading is necessary to ensure safe disposal and to avoid paying for disposal of "clean fill."  The TCLP procedure is generally useful for classifying waste material for disposal options.  

Spent abrasive or soil from a construction site usually needs to have a TCLP for lead done to determine where the waste goes next.

Procedure
TCLP comprises four fundamental procedures:
 Sample preparation for leaching
 Sample leaching
 Preparation of leachate for analysis
 Leachate analysis

In the TCLP procedure the pH of the sample material is first established, and then leached with an acetic acid / sodium hydroxide solution at a 1:20 mix of sample to solvent. For example, a TCLP jug may contain 100g of sample and 2000 mL of solution. The leachate mixture is sealed in extraction vessel for general analytes, or possibly pressure sealed as in zero-headspace extractions (ZHE) for volatile organic compounds and tumbled for 18 hours to simulate an extended leaching time in the ground. It is then filtered so that only the solution (not the sample) remains and this is then analyzed.

See also
Landfill gas monitoring

References

 Davis, Sherry (2001). "Regulated Metals: The Rule of 20." Pollution Prevention Institute, Kansas State University.
 Environment, Health and Safety Online. "The EPA TCLP: Toxicity Characteristic Leaching Procedure and Characteristic Wastes (D-codes)." 2008-03-07.

External links
 "TCLP Questions" - EPA

Environmental soil science
Hazardous waste
Landfill